William W. Armstrong (1864 – July 20, 1944) was an American lawyer and politician from Rochester, Monroe County, New York. In addition to his long legal career in Rochester, he represented his city in both houses of the state legislature. While a member of the state Senate he led an investigation into life insurance company operations and financing that led to publishing the Armstrong Report in 1906. He described himself once as a minority of a minority, since he was "An Irishman, a protestant, and a Republican."

Life
Armstrong was born to Irish immigrants in Rochester, New York, but while an infant his family moved to Albion, New York where he attended public schools and spent his young adulthood. His formal education was ended in 1880 when he started work to help his family after his father became blind. But he continued study and was admitted to the bar early in 1888.

Armstrong was a member of the New York State Assembly (Monroe Co., 3rd D.) in 1895, 1896, 1897 and 1898. During his second term, he caused quite a row and made his reputation for honesty. While speaking against a bill wanted by the Insurance companies and the state commission, he read aloud into the record a note he had been handed from Senator J. Irving Burns that it could be made worth his while to drop his opposition. In 1898, Armstrong was elected to the state Senate while Burns was defeated.

Armstrong was a member of the New York State Senate from 1899 to 1908, sitting in the 122nd, 123rd, 124th, 125th, 126th, 127th, 128th, 129th (all eight 44th D.), 130th and 131st New York State Legislatures (both 46th D.).

External links
Outline at Rochester General Hospital.
The Armstrong Report text from Google.

Notes

1864 births
1944 deaths
Politicians from Rochester, New York
Republican Party members of the New York State Assembly
Republican Party New York (state) state senators
Lawyers from Rochester, New York